Vilić is a village in the municipality of Ilijaš, Bosnia and Herzegovina.Vilić is also a village in Croatia, near Omiš.

Demographics 
According to the 2013 census, its population was 6, all Bosniaks.

References

Populated places in Ilijaš